Dumsane Mabuza (born 18 May 1968) is a Swazi boxer. He competed in the men's featherweight event at the 1988 Summer Olympics.

References

External links
 

1968 births
Living people
Featherweight boxers
Swazi male boxers
Olympic boxers of Eswatini
Boxers at the 1988 Summer Olympics
Place of birth missing (living people)